Igor Lazić (born 8 August 1967) is a Bosnian-Herzegovinian retired footballer.

External links

1967 births
Living people
Footballers from Sarajevo
Association football midfielders
Yugoslav footballers
Bosnia and Herzegovina footballers
FK Sarajevo players
ASOA Valence players
Grenoble Foot 38 players
FC St. Gallen players
Dynamo Dresden players
FC Energie Cottbus players
1. FC Lokomotive Leipzig players
SV Babelsberg 03 players
Yugoslav First League players
Ligue 2 players
2. Bundesliga players
Regionalliga players
Bosnia and Herzegovina expatriate footballers
Expatriate footballers in France
Bosnia and Herzegovina expatriate sportspeople in France
Expatriate footballers in Switzerland
Bosnia and Herzegovina expatriate sportspeople in Switzerland
Expatriate footballers in Germany
Bosnia and Herzegovina expatriate sportspeople in Germany
Bosnia and Herzegovina football managers
TuS Koblenz managers
Berliner FC Dynamo managers
Bosnia and Herzegovina expatriate football managers
Expatriate football managers in Germany